Taft is an unincorporated community in Lincoln County, Tennessee, United States. The community has a post office with ZIP code 38488. Taft is located at the intersection of State Route 110 (Ardmore Highway) and State Route 274 (Old Railroad Bed Road).

Demographics

Notes

Unincorporated communities in Lincoln County, Tennessee
Unincorporated communities in Tennessee